Charles Timothy O'Leary (October 15, 1875 – January 6, 1941) was an American professional baseball shortstop who played eleven seasons with the Detroit Tigers (1904–1912), St. Louis Cardinals (1913), and St. Louis Browns (1934) of Major League Baseball (MLB).

Early life
Born in Chicago, Illinois to Irish immigrants Timothy and Ellen O’Leary, who had 16 children (11 boys). O'Leary worked at age 16 for a clothing company and played on the company's semi-pro baseball team. His talent as a middle infielder and scrappy hitter came to the attention of Charles Comiskey, owner of the Chicago White Sox. Though there is no independent verification, O'Leary reportedly signed briefly with the White Sox, only to have his arm broken from a pitched ball thrown by 'fireballer' and Hall of Famer, Rube Waddell.

Major leagues
O'Leary made his major league debut on April 14, 1904, with the Tigers. He was Detroit's starting shortstop from 1904 to 1907 and became a backup shortstop and utility infielder from 1908–1912.

In the off-season, O'Leary and teammate Germany Schaefer, known as one of baseball's zaniest characters, worked as a comic vaudeville act. The O'Leary-Schaefer vaudeville act is said to have inspired two Metro-Goldwyn-Mayer musicals: the forgotten 1930 film They Learned About Women, featuring the noted vaudeville act Van and Schenck, plus Busby Berkeley's last film, Take Me Out to the Ballgame (1949), with Gene Kelly and Frank Sinatra.

Not known for his hitting, O'Leary had a career batting average of .226.

After finishing his playing career in 1913 with the St. Louis Cardinals, O'Leary became a player-manager in the minor and semi-pro leagues for several years, including in San Francisco, St. Paul, San Antonio, and Chicago, until he was offered a coaching job in 1920 by his close friend, Miller Huggins, manager of the New York Yankees. After a 17–0 victory over the Washington Senators on July 6, 1920, O'Leary was returning to New York in a car driven by Babe Ruth, along with Ruth's wife Helen, rookie outfielder Frank Gleich, and second-string catcher Fred Hofmann. Ruth lost control of the car, and O'Leary was ejected from the vehicle, although he suffered only minor injuries. He then coached with the Yankees for 10 years, during which period they won six pennants and two World Series, including the great 1927 Yankees team. O'Leary then coached with the Chicago Cubs under Rogers Hornsby, and with the St. Louis Browns.

On September 30, 1934, several weeks shy of his 59th birthday, O'Leary was brought out of retirement by the Browns. In a pinch-hitting appearance, he singled and scored, becoming both the oldest Major League Baseball player to collect a hit and to score a run.

He died from peritonitis in Chicago on January 6, 1941, and was buried at Mount Olivet Cemetery.

Date of birth
During his career, O'Leary claimed to have been born in 1882. However, in 2010, a researcher for the Society for American Baseball Research found him in the 1880 census. His draft record for World War I, which showed that he was born in 1875, was subsequently located. This made him the second oldest major league baseball player to appear in a game, after Satchel Paige.

See also
 List of oldest Major League Baseball players
 1909 Detroit Tigers season
 List of St. Louis Cardinals coaches

References

External links
 Baseball-Reference.com
 Legends of the Game
 Legends of the Dead Ball Era

Detroit Tigers players
St. Louis Cardinals players
St. Louis Browns players
Major League Baseball shortstops
New York Yankees coaches
Sportspeople from Chicago
Baseball players from Chicago
Vaudeville performers
1875 births
1941 deaths
Chicago Cubs coaches
St. Louis Browns coaches
St. Louis Cardinals coaches
Chicago White Stockings (minor league) players
Des Moines Hawkeyes players
Des Moines Midgets players
Des Moines Undertakers players
Indianapolis Indians managers
Indianapolis Indians players
San Francisco Seals (baseball) players
St. Paul Saints (AA) players
Jersey City Skeeters players
San Antonio Bronchos players